The 1972 AIAW women's basketball tournament was held on March 16–19, 1972.  The host site was Illinois State University in Normal, Illinois.  

Sixteen teams participated.  Immaculata University, coached by Hall-of-Famer Cathy Rush, was crowned national champion at the conclusion of the tournament.

Tournament bracket

Main bracket

Consolation bracket

References

AIAW women's basketball tournament
AIAW
AIAW National Division I Basketball Championship
1972 in sports in Illinois
Women's sports in Illinois